Omus californicus, the California night-stalking tiger beetle, is a species of tiger beetle in the family Carabidae. It is found in North America.

Subspecies
These six subspecies belong to the species Omus californicus:
 Omus californicus angustocylindricus W. Horn, 1913 (narrow night-stalking tiger beetle)
 Omus californicus californicus Eschscholtz, 1829 (California night-stalking tiger beetle)
 Omus californicus intermedius Leng, 1902 (intermediate night-stalking tiger beetle)
 Omus californicus lecontei (Leconte's night-stalking tiger beetle)
 Omus californicus subcylindricus Nunenmacher, 1940 (subcylindrical night-stalking tiger beetle)
 Omus californicus vermiculatus Casey

References

Further reading

 

Cicindelidae
Articles created by Qbugbot
Beetles described in 1829
Beetles of North America